Obie usually refers to the Obie Award, an off-Broadway theater award.

Obie may also refer to:

People
 Obie Baizley (1917-2000), politician in Manitoba, Canada
 Renaldo Benson (1936-2005), American soul and R&B singer and songwriter
 Obie Bermúdez (born 1981), Puerto Rican Latin pop, salsa singer and composer
 Obie Bristow (1900–1969), professional football player in the early National Football League
 Obie Fernandez, Ruby and Ruby on Rails developer
 Obie Graves, former Citrus College and Cal State Fullerton football player
 Obie Etie Ikechukwu (born 1987), Nigerian footballer who plays as a midfielder
 Bob O'Billovich (also "Obie"; born 1940), east regional scout for the BC Lions of the Canadian Football League
 William Obanhein (also "Officer Obie"; 1924–1994), chief of police for the town of Stockbridge, Massachusetts
 Obie Oberholzer (born 1947), South African photographer
 Obie Patterson (born 1938), American politician
 Obie Trice (born 1977), American rapper and songwriter
 Obie Trotter (born 1984), American-Hungarian professional basketball player
 Obie Scott Wade, American producer, director and screenwriter
 Obie Walker (1911–1989), professional boxer
 Obelit Yadgar (aldo Obie Yadgar; born 1945), Assyrian-American radio personality
 Young Jessie (Obediah Donnell "Obie" Jessie; born 1936), African American R&B and jazz singer and songwriter

Other uses
 Catch light, a video camera-mounted light also referred to as Obies, invented by Lucien Ballard

See also
 Obi (disambiguation)

Lists of people by nickname